The 1919 Washington State Cougars football team was an American football team that represented Washington State College during the 1919 college football season. Head coach Gus Welch led the team to a 2–2 mark in the PCC and 5–2 overall. This year marked the team's adoption of the "Cougars" nickname.

Schedule

References

Washington State
Washington State Cougars football seasons
Washington State Cougars football